Jerrawa was a small railway station, at the locality also known as Jerrawa, on the Main South railway line in New South Wales, Australia.

History 
It opened in 1875 as a crossing loop with a goods siding.

The line was duplicated , and the goods siding was arranged so that it was connected to the main lines with trailing points. There were also refuge loops in both directions.

In its final form, Jerrawa had an island platform between the two main lines and several goods sidings. The building on the platform was of timber construction, with corrugated iron roofing.

It was closed to passenger services in 1975. The platform was removed and the mainlines straightened, in 1984, but a signal box and sidings remained. The signal box was removed when semaphore signals were replaced by colour light signals c2010.

References 

Disused regional railway stations in New South Wales
Railway stations in Australia opened in 1875
Railway stations closed in 1975
Main Southern railway line, New South Wales